N57 may refer to:

Roads 
 N57 motorway (Netherlands)
 N57 road (Ireland), now the N26
 Nebraska Highway 57, in the United States

Military
 N-57/OKB-16-57, an experimental Soviet autocannon
 Escadrille N57, a unit of the French Air Force
 , a submarine of the Royal Navy

Other uses 
 N57 (Long Island bus)
 BMW N57, an automobile engine
 New Garden Airport, in Toughkenamon, Pennsylvania, United States